The Loose Nut is a 1945 Walter Lantz Cartune directed by James Culhane. It was released on December 17, 1945, and features Woody Woodpecker. It was also produced by Walter Lantz Productions and was distributed by Universal Pictures.

The short is the first cartoon to pin Woody against a burly man named Bull Dozer. Dozer would later reappear as Woody's foe in Woodpecker in the Rough from 1952 as a golfer, and in Wrestling Wrecks from 1953 as a wrestler.

Plot
A construction worker named Bull Dozer is cementing a sidewalk and is pretty proud of himself. Meanwhile, Woody is playing golf in a tree. He putters the ball which lands in the wet cement. Dozer, furious, gives Woody his golf ball back. It turns out, that Woody made foot tracks in the cement, Dozer forces Woody to smooth them out. He takes two of the spreaders and put on his feet like ice skates. Woody skates out the tracks he made. Dozer soon makes a ball of wet cement and throws it at Woody, causing him to crash. Woody then emerges from the ball, takes a mallet and putters the ball of cement into the Dozer's face. Dozer is now trapped in the wet cement. Woody then skates back over to the man and repeatedly hits him with a shovel.

Woody then tries to run Bull Dozer over with a steamroller. he runs in fear from the woodpecker and is chased out of the cement. He is chased into the construction office and hides, only to open the door and get run down. Dozer is completely flat and Woody rolls him up. He then takes him over to an advertisement for the gym with a picture of a fat woman on a billboard and pastes him on there like sticker, making fun of his weight. Dozer emerges from the billboard, but with the backside of the fat woman.

Bull Dozer tries to grab Woody's golf club, only to be accidentally knocked underground. Woody discovers the ball in the man's mouth. He putters it anyway and sends the man's dentures flying. Dozer chases Woody up a ladder, but is hit in the head by Woody with a mallet. He falls down and Woody drops a barrel on Dozer. He replaces Woody's golf ball with a bomb that looks the same as one and blows up both of the characters. Woody, now featherless, still holds a high spirit and does his trademark laugh before being chased through the wet sidewalk, ruining it once again.

Voice cast
Ben Hardaway as Woody Woodpecker
Will Wright as Bull Dozer

Production notes 
The Loose Nut is notable for its climatic sequence (animated by Pat Matthews) in which Woody runs over Bull Dozer with a steam roller, which included haphazard camera angles, rapid jump cuts and stylistic explosion effects, depicted with red, blue and yellow paint strokes. Loyola Marymount University professor and Animation program Chair Tom Klein noted that scene as well as an explosion in the end of the cartoon as early representations of modern art in American animation, and called the sequences "the convergence of animation and Soviet montage." James Culhane had already been experimenting with techniques used by Russian filmmakers since The Barber of Seville (1944), and was able to amplify the execution up to that point. Klein adds that the cartoon is a metaphor for Culhane himself, but with "a bit of modernist mischief."

Beginning with The Loose Nut, the "00's" in Woody's name in the opening log sequence have been changed to nut screws.

References

External links 

1945 animated films
Walter Lantz Productions shorts
Woody Woodpecker films
1940s American animated films
Universal Pictures animated short films
Golf animation
Animated films about animals
Animated films about birds
1945 films
Films directed by James Culhane